The Valle de Ángeles Redbeds (Kva) is a Late Albian to Early Cenomanian geologic formation of the in western Honduras. Dinosaur remains are among the fossils that have been recovered from the formation, although none have yet been referred to a specific genus.

Description 
The Valle de Angeles Formation comprises claystones, sandstones and quartz- and shale-rich conglomerates. The formation is overlain by the Guanaco Formation.

Paleofauna
Ornithopoda indet. - "femur"

See also 

 List of dinosaur-bearing rock formations
 List of stratigraphic units with indeterminate dinosaur fossils
 List of fossiliferous stratigraphic units in Honduras

References

Bibliography 
 
 
 

Geologic formations of Honduras
Cretaceous Honduras
Albian Stage
Cenomanian Stage
Sandstone formations
Shale formations
Conglomerate formations
Paleontology in Honduras
Formations